Slovtsov may refer to:

Pyotr Slovtsov (1886–1934), Russian tenor
7453 Slovtsov, an asteroid discovered in 1978